Akademmistechko is a Ukrainian name which may refer to:

 Akademmistechko (Kyiv Metro), a station on the Kyiv Metro
 Akademmistechko (Kyiv), a neighbourhood in Kyiv, the capital of Ukraine
 Academical town, meaning the neighbourhood surrounding the National Academy of Sciences of Ukraine

See also
Akademgorodok (disambiguation)